Envision may refer to:

Organizations
 Envision EMI, a  management company  based in Virginia, USA
 Envision Energy, a wind turbine manufacturer and energy technology company based in Shanghai, China
 Envision Financial, a financial institution based in British Columbia, Canada
 Envision Healthcare, a hospital company based in the United States
 Envision Racing, a racing team that competes in Formula E 
 Envision Schools, a school management organization based in San Francisco, USA
 Envision, Inc., a not-for-profit based in Wichita, Kansas, USA

Vehicles
 Buick Envision, crossover vehicle
 EnVision, a Venus orbiter in development

Other
 Olivetti Envision, an Italian multimedia device
 Envision (song), by the band Theatre of Tragedy

See also